NASCAR's 50 Greatest Drivers is an alphabetical list of NASCAR drivers.

In 1998, as part of its 50th anniversary celebration, NASCAR gathered a panel to select the "50 Greatest NASCAR Drivers of All Time." It was inspired in part by the NBA's decision to select the 50 Greatest Players in NBA History on its 50th anniversary in 1996. An independent group of 51 individuals representing various NASCAR roles were asked to give their objective and educated opinions on who the 50 greatest drivers in NASCAR history were. To quote Bill France Jr., president of NASCAR:

The living members of this group were honored on February 15, 1998 during pre-race festivities for the 1998 Daytona 500 at Daytona International Speedway.

NASCAR's 50 Greatest Drivers (as of February 1998)

See also
1998 in NASCAR
List of all-time NASCAR Cup Series winners
List of members of the NASCAR Hall of Fame
List of NASCAR champions

External links
 NASCAR.com's listing (Archived link)
 The Inside Groove.com – Historical NASCAR Image Gallery

50 Greatest Drivers
1998-related lists
NASCAR's 50 Greatest Drivers
Lists of 20th-century people
Lists of American sportspeople
50 Greatest Drivers
Lists of sportsmen
Top sports lists